The Meeker Memorial Museum, also known as the N. C. Meeker Home, is a historic building in Greeley, Colorado. It was built as a private residence for Nathan Meeker in 1870. Meeker was a homesteader who founded the Union Colony of Colorado, later known as Greeley. The house was purchased by the city of Greeley in 1927, and later turned into a museum, the first in the town. It has been listed on the National Register of Historic Places since February 26, 1970.

References

External links

Greeley Museums

National Register of Historic Places in Weld County, Colorado
Buildings and structures completed in 1870
History museums in Colorado
Museums in Weld County, Colorado